Benn John Valsø (November 5, 1927 – December 7, 1995) was a Norwegian bobsledder who competed in the late 1940s. He finished tenth in the four-man event at the 1948 Winter Olympics in St. Moritz.

References
1948 bobsleigh four-man results
Benn John Valsø's profile at Sports Reference.com

Olympic bobsledders of Norway
Bobsledders at the 1948 Winter Olympics
Norwegian male bobsledders
1927 births
1995 deaths